Tau Scorpii, Latinized from τ Scorpii, formally known as Paikauhale , is a star in the southern zodiac constellation of Scorpius. The apparent visual magnitude of Tau Scorpii is +2.8, while parallax measurements yield a distance estimate of roughly 470 light-years (150 parsecs) from Earth.

Description

Compared to the Sun, Tau Scorpii is a massive OB star with 15 times the Sun's mass and more than six times the radius of the Sun. It is radiating about 20,400 times the Sun's luminosity from its outer envelope at an effective temperature of 31,440 K. This gives it the blue-white hue characteristic of B-type stars. As yet there is no evidence of a companion in orbit around τ Sco. It is a magnetic star whose surface magnetic field was mapped by means of Zeeman–Doppler imaging. Tau Scorpii is rotating relatively slowly with a period of 41 days.

The spectrum of this star shows triply ionized oxygen (O IV) that is being generated by X-rays and the Auger ionization effect. Observations with the ROSAT space telescope showed it has a higher energy (harder) X-ray spectrum than is usual for B0 V stars. Over the energy range 0.8–1.2 keV, its X-ray luminosity is Lx =  with a large Lx to Lbol of log Lx/Lbol = –6.53 from ASCA measurements. ROSAT measurements showed a log Lx/Lbol ≃ –5.93 for the range 0.1–2.4 keV. The hard component of the X-ray spectrum from τ Sco as studied with XMM-Newton supports the presence of in-falling clumps of plasma in τ Sco.

This star is a proper motion member of the Upper Scorpius subgroup of the
Scorpius–Centaurus OB association,
the nearest such co-moving association of massive stars to the Sun. 

Nomenclature

τ Scorpii (Latinised to Tau Scorpii) is the star's Bayer designation.

Tau Scorpii and Sigma Scorpii together bore the traditional name Al Niyat (or Alniyat) derived from the Arabic النياط al-niyāţ "the arteries" and referring to their position flanking the star Antares, the scorpion's heart, with Tau Scorpii being the star to the south. 

Paikauhale is the Hawaiian name for Tau Scorpii. In the Hawaiian dictionary by Pukuʻi & Elbert (1986), the word paikauhale  is defined as to go gadding about from house to house. In another Hawaiian dictionary (H.W. Kent, 1993, "Treasury of Hawaiian Words in One Hundred and One Categories", p.367), paikauhale is defined as Vagabond owning no home; house-to-house wanderer. 

In 2016, the IAU organized a Working Group on Star Names (WGSN) to catalog and standardize proper names for stars. The WGSN approved the name Paikauhale for the star A on 10 August 2018 and it is now so included in the List of IAU-approved Star Names.
The name Alniyat was given to Sigma Scorpii.

Cultural signification

The indigenous Boorong people of northwestern Victoria saw this star (together with σ Sco) as wives of  Djuit (Antares).

References 

B-type main-sequence stars
Astronomical X-ray sources
Upper Scorpius

Scorpius (constellation)
Scorpii, Tau
Durchmusterung objects
Scorpii, 23
149438
081266
6165
Paikauhale